Chapter III is the third full-length studio album by the German symphonic black metal band Agathodaimon. In 2009 Metal Mind Productions reissued the album as a remastered digipak edition. The reissue is limited to numerated 2000 copies and was digitally remastered using 24-Bit process on golden disc.

Tracks

Personnel
 Sathonys - guitars, clean vocals, design
 Eddie - bass
 Felix Ü. Walzer - keyboards
 Frank "Akaias" Nordmann - vocals
 Matze - drums

Additional personnel and staff
 Thilo Feucht - guitars
 Randu Menulesco - vocals on "Sacred Divinity"
 Markus Staiger - executive producer
 Kristian Kohlmannslehner - producer, engineering
 Gerhard Magin - mixing
 Johannes Rau - band photography
 Gerald Axelrod - photography

External links
Chapter III at allmusic

Agathodaimon (band) albums
Nuclear Blast albums
2001 albums